Kateryna Kremko, known professionally as Miss K8, is a DJ from Kyiv, Ukraine. She played at music festivals including Defqon 1 and Masters of Hardcore, gaining recognition for her performances. In 2019, Kateryna took some time off due to pregnancy.

Career 
She released her debut single in 2012 titled "Unforgettable", which was released on the Masters of Hardcore record label. Her debut "Divide & Conquer" EP, which is a collaboration with Angerfist was released at the end of the year. In 2013, she released her Breathless EP. In 2015, Miss K8 debuted on the Top 100 DJs poll by DJ Mag at 94. In 2016 Miss K8 reached position 88 in the DJ Mag Top 100, in 2017 she climbed to #58, in 2018 she was awarded #65 and in 2019 she was voted #69. 

Her debut studio album MAGNET was released on the 26th of March 2016 alongside the annual Masters of Hardcore event, held in the Brabanthallen in 's-Hertogenbosch, The Netherlands. At this edition of Masters of Hardcore, she was also responsible for the event's official anthem "Raiders of Rampage" featuring Nolz.  
In 2022, she released her bran new album: Eclipse.

She has performed at large Hardcore music festivals such as Masters of Hardcore, Dominator, SYNDICATE, Defqon.1, Decibel Outdoor Festival and more.    Her track "Raiders of Rampage" featuring Nolz was ranked the #1 Hardcore track in the Masters of Hardcore Top 100 in 2016.  And in 2018, she received the #1 award for her track "Out of the Frame" in the Masters of Hardcore Top 100.

Discography

Studio albums

Extended plays

Singles

References

External links 
 Official Website
 Official Instagram Account
 Profile on SoundCloud
 Profile on Allmusic

Living people
Ukrainian record producers
Ukrainian DJs
Musicians from Kyiv
Techno musicians
Hardstyle musicians
Electronic dance music DJs
Year of birth missing (living people)
21st-century women musicians
Ukrainian women record producers
Women in electronic music
Women DJs